The 2021–22 BIBL season is the 14th edition of Balkan International Basketball League (BIBL). 10-13 teams from Bulgaria, Israel, Kosovo, Montenegro and North Macedonia will participate in the competition.

Teams

First round 
Ten teams drawn into two groups consisting of five teams each. Teams from the same country will be drawn in different groups. Peja will be drawn into a group with two teams from North Macedonia due to traveling schedule. Teams play against each other home-and-away basis. The teams placed 1st, 2nd, 3rd and 4th from each group will advanced to the second round.

During September, the league management announced the addition of two teams to the first round. On October 6, the league management decided to take Peja out of the tournament since Peja refused to confirm the competition's official schedule as well as fulfill all their financial obligations towards the league in the deadlines set. On October 13, the league management announced that Maccabi Haifa will take Peja's place as the 2nd participant in the league.

On 26 November, The Balkan International Basketball League management decided to take Kumanovo 2009 out of the competition due to its inability to fulfill its obligations. All its results were annulled, and its remaining games cancelled.

Draw
The draw took place on 26 August. The Ten teams was divided into 5 Seeds and drawn into two groups of five.

Group A

Group B

Second round 
The results between the teams from the same groups in the first round shall be carried forward into this round. The eight teams will be divided into new two groups of four teams each. Teams play against each other on a home-and-away basis. The teams placed 1st from each group will advance to the Final Four. The teams placed 2nd and 3rd from each group will advance to the Quarter-Finals.

Group C

Group D

Knockout rounds

Quarterfinals

Game 1

Game 2

Final Four
The Final Four games will be composed of two semi-final games, third-place game and final game. Due Three teams from Israel qualified to the Final Four a draw will be made to determine the two pairs of the Semi Final games.

Source:

Semifinals

Third place

Final

Awards

MVP of the Month

First Round awards

MVP of the Second Round

MVP of the Final Four

References

External links 
 Official website
 Scoreboard
 Flashcore

2021-22
BIBL
2021–22 in North Macedonia basketball
2021–22 in Bulgarian basketball
2021–22 in Montenegrin basketball
2021–22 in Israeli basketball